Songlai (Songlai Chin) is a Kuki-Chin language of Burma. It is 90% lexically similar to Laitu Chin, but not mutually intelligible. Dialects are Doitu, Hettui, Mang Um (Song), and Lai.

Geographical distribution
Songlai is spoken along the Laymyo (Lemro) or Phunglaung river in the following townships of western Burma (Ethnologue).

Paletwa township, Chin State (Mang Um, Doitu, and Hettui dialects)
Mrauk-U township, Rakhine State (Lai dialect)

References

Kuki-Chin languages